Katsunari (written: 勝成) is a masculine Japanese given name. Notable people with the name include:

, Japanese footballer
, Japanese golfer
, Japanese boxer

Japanese masculine given names